Geoffrey David Cotter (born 4 October 1966) is a New Zealand rower.

Cotter was born in 1966 in Taihape, New Zealand. He represented New Zealand at the 1988 Summer Olympics in the coxless four in a team with Campbell Clayton-Greene, Bill Coventry, and Neil Gibson, where they came seventh. He is listed as New Zealand Olympian athlete number 542 by the New Zealand Olympic Committee.

References

1966 births
Living people
New Zealand male rowers
Rowers at the 1988 Summer Olympics
Olympic rowers of New Zealand
People from Taihape